Kozhino is a rural locality (a village) in Polozovoskoye Rural Settlement, Bolshesosnovsky District, Perm Krai, Russia. The population was 2 as of 2010. There is 1 street.

Geography 
Kozhino is located on the Lyp River, 58 km northeast of Bolshaya Sosnova (the district's administrative centre) by road. Nizhny Lyp is the nearest rural locality.

References 

Rural localities in Bolshesosnovsky District